The 1979 Copa Libertadores Finals was the final two-legged tie to determine the 1979 Copa Libertadores champion. It was contested by club Boca Juniors and club Olimpia. The first leg of the tie was played on July 22 at Olimpia' home field, with the second leg played on July 27 at Boca Juniors'. It was Olimpia 2nd Copa Libertadores finals and 4th finals for Boca Juniors.

Olimpia won the series after winning the first leg tie 2-0 at Asunción's Estadio Defensores del Chaco, and tying the second leg tie 0-0 at Buenos Aires's Estadio Alberto J. Armando and accumulated more points than their opponent.

Qualified teams

Rules
The finals will be played over two legs; home and away. The team that accumulates the most points —two for a win, one for a draw, zero for a loss— after the two legs will be crowned the champion. If the two teams are tied on points after the second leg, a playoff in a neutral venue will become the next tie-breaker. Goal difference is going to be used as a last resort.

Venues

Matches

First leg

Second leg

References

1979 in South American football
1979
l
Club Olimpia matches
Copa
Copa